Karel Štěch (1908–1982) was a famous Czechoslovak landscape painter, graphic designer, woodcutter, and illustrator popular during the Communist era of Czechoslovakia.

External links
Woodcuts
Further Work

1908 births
1982 deaths
Czechoslovak painters